Aras Amiri is an Iranian national who resides in London, where she works as an artist affairs officer for the British Council. 
In 2018, Amiri was arrested by the Iranian authorities during a visit in Iran, and in 2019 was sentenced to 10 years for "cultural infiltration". 

Because she did not hold dual citizenship, she had no support from the Foreign Office during her arrest. Amiri was then released on in April 2020, following the COVID-19 crisis. In August 2021, Amiri was acquitted from her charges.

See also 
 List of foreign nationals detained in Iran

References 

Living people
Year of birth missing (living people)
People of the British Council
Iranian prisoners and detainees
Inmates of Evin Prison